Hercule was a late 100-gun ship of the line of the French Navy and the lead ship of her class. She was launched in 1836, took part in the French campaigns in Algeria and was struck from the navy in 1860. She continued to give service as a hulk, and was broken up in 1882.

Service history
Commanded by Joseph Grégoire Casy, in October 1837 Hercule provided a landing party, including François d'Orléans, Prince of Joinville, third son of the French monarch, to assist in the French campaign to take the city of Constantine from Ahmed Bey ben Mohamed Chérif, but they arrived 4 days after the city had fallen. A 10-month cruise to West Africa, South America, the Caribbean and the United States followed, with the ship returning to Brest on 11 July 1838.

From 1839, she was appointed to the Mediterranean squadron, under Captain Fauré. In 1842, she was transferred to the Middle East. In October 1850, she was sent to Brest for a refit. Her armament was updated to include Paixhans guns.

In 1860, she was struck from the lists of the navy. From this point on, she was used as a support ship. She was used as a prison hulk from 1875 in Brest, and broken up in 1882.

References

External links 

 100-guns ships of the line

Ships of the line of the French Navy
1836 ships
Hercule-class ships of the line
Victorian-era ships of the line